William Moore Jr. (born December 20, 1978), better known by his stage names Pretty Willie, Willie Moore, and P-Dub, is an actor, comedian, producer, speaker, radio host, singer, and licensed minister from St. Louis, Missouri.

Discography

Studio albums

References

External links
Official website

Living people
African-American Christians
African-American songwriters
Musicians from St. Louis
Christian hip hop
American performers of Christian music
Performers of Christian hip hop music
Songwriters from Missouri
1978 births
21st-century African-American people
20th-century African-American people